The 2010–11 Hartford Hawks men's basketball team  represented the University of Hartford during the 2010–11 NCAA Division I men's basketball season. John Gallagher who served as an assistant coach at Hartford from 2006-2008 returned to take over the head coaching position after Dan Leibovitz left at the end of the previous season to take an assistant coaching position at Penn. Also this season Hartford restarted its old division II rivalry with Central Connecticut as they played in the first game of the season in the Connecticut 6 Tournament.

Roster

Schedule 

|-
!colspan=9 style=| Non-conference regular season

|-
!colspan=9 style=| America East regular season

|-
!colspan=9 style=| America East Men's tournament

References

Hartford Hawks men's basketball seasons
Hartford Hawks
Hartford
Hartford